Kalisz Voivodeship may also refer to:

Kalisz Voivodeship (1314–1793)
Kalisz Voivodeship (1816–1837)
Kalisz Voivodeship (1975–1998)